Fran is a Spanish, Italian, Croatian, Slovene and Albanian unisex name (respectively Fanny/Francisca/Francisco, Francesca/Francesco and Fran(j)o), and a common short form (hypocorism) of the English names Frances and Francis. The Spanish and Italian Fran is more common for men, while the English name is mostly used for women. The Croatian, Slovenian and Albanian Fran is used only for men.

Fran is the name of:

People

Women
 Fran Adams, American actress 
 Frances Fran Allison (1907–1989), American television and radio comedian, personality and singer, star of the television show Kukla, Fran and Ollie
 Fran Baum, Australian social scientist
 Fran Blanche, American engineer and guitar pedal builder
 Frances Fran Brill (born 1946), American retired Muppets puppeteer and actress
 Fran Capo, American motivational speaker and author
 Francine Fran Drescher (born 1957), American actress
 Fran Gebhard, Canadian theatre director and actor
 Francis Fran Jeffries (1937–2016), American actress, singer and model
 Fran Jonas (born 2004), New Zealand cricketer
 Fran Kirby (born 1993), English association footballer
 Frances Fran Lebowitz (born 1950), American author and public speaker
 Fran Ross (1935–1985), American comedy writer and novelist
 Fran Ryan (1916–2000), American actress
 Fran Scott, British television presenter
 Fran Stallings (born 1943), American storyteller
 Fran Unsworth (born 1957), BBC News executive
 Fran Warren, stage name of American singer Frances Wolfe (1926–2013)
 Frances Fran Wilde (born 1948), New Zealand politician

Men
 Fran Albreht (1889–1963), Slovene writer and politician
 Fran Bošnjaković (1902–1993), Croatian thermodynamicist
 Fran Bradač (1885–1970), Slovene classical philologist
 Fran Brodić (born 1997), Croatian football player
 Fran Cosgrave (born 1977), Irish nightclub owner and minor celebrity
 Fran Čubranić (born 1997), Croatian water polo player
 Fran Detela (1850–1926), Slovene writer
 Francisco Fran Escribá (born 1965), Spanish football manager
 Fran Krsto Frankopan (1643–1671) Croatian baroque poet, nobleman and politician
 Fran Fraschilla (born 1958), American basketball commentator and former college basketball coach
 Fran Saleški Finžgar (1871–1962), Slovene folk writer
 Fran Galović (1887–1914), Croatian writer
 Fran Gerbič (1840–1917), Slovene composer
 Francisco Javier González Pérez (born 1969), Spanish footballer better known as Fran
 Francis Fran Healy (baseball) (born 1946), American Major League Baseball broadcaster and former player
 Francis Fran Healy (musician) (born 1973), Scottish lead singer and main songwriter of the rock band Travis
 Fran Jesenko (1875–1932), Slovenian botanist
 Fran Karačić (born 1996), Croatian football player
 Fran Kurniawan (born 1985), Indonesian badminton player
 Fran Levstik (1831–1887), Slovene writer, political activist, playwright and critic
 Fran Lhotka (1883–1962), Czech-born Croatian composer
 Fran Mileta (born 2000), Croatian handball player
 Fran Millar (born 1949), American politician
 Fran Milčinski (1867–1932), pen name Fridolin Žolna, Slovene lawyer, writer and playwright
 Fran Novljan (1879–1977), Croatian educator
 Francis Fran O'Brien (American football) (1936–1999), American National Football League player
 Fran O'Brien (footballer) (born 1955), Irish footballer in Ireland and the North American Soccer League
 Francisco Fran Perea (born 1978), Spanish singer and actor
 Fran Pilepić (born 1989), Croatian basketball player
 Fran Ramovš (1890–1952), Slovene linguist
 Fran Roš (1898–1976), Slovene writer, poet and playwright
 Fran Smith Jr. (fl. 1978-present), American bass guitarist with the rock band The Hooters
 Francis Fran Tarkenton (born 1940), American retired National Football League Hall-of-Fame quarterback
 Fran Tudor (born 1995), Croatian football player
 Francisco Fran Vázquez (born 1983), Spanish basketball player
 Francisco Fran Vélez (born 1991), Spanish footballer
 Francisco Javier Fran Yeste (born 1979), Spanish footballer

Fictional characters
 Fran Kubelik, the female main character of the film The Apartment, portrayed by Shirley MacLaine
 Fran Sinclair, mother of the Sinclair family on the sitcom Dinosaurs
 Fran, from the video game Final Fantasy XII
 Fran, a red squirrel from the Playhouse Disney Channel show Higglytown Heroes
 The main character of the video game Fran Bow
 Fran, the protagonist of the manga series Franken Fran

See also
Frane

English unisex given names
Unisex given names
Croatian masculine given names
Slovene masculine given names
Hypocorisms
Lists of people by nickname